An election to elect representatives to the First Peoples' Assembly in the Australian state of Victoria occurred in 2019. The election filled seats to the body which was charged with the responsibility of preparing for negotiations with the Government of Victoria about a treaty with the state's Aboriginal population.

The voting period was 16 September to 20 October 2019. Only Aboriginal and Torres Strait Islander people living in Victoria and at least 16 years of age were eligible to vote in the election. However, only 7% of the eligible voters turned out to vote.

Background
In June 2018 the Victorian Parliament passed legislation to create a framework for negotiating a treaty with Aboriginal people. The legislation was supported by the Labor Government and the Greens, though not by the two opposition parties, the Liberal and National parties. The legislation included provisions to create an Aboriginal representative body and its implementation was overseen by the Victorian Treaty Advancement Commission chaired by Jill Gallagher. The lead-up to the vote was not without controversy, as it occurred amidst the Andrews Labor Government's planned duplication of the Western Highway near Ararat. The duplication plans included a proposal to disrupt a cultural site with trees sacred to Aboriginal people in the area. A protest on the steps of Parliament House included protesters with signs saying "no trees, no treaty".

Assembly
The Assembly was filled by 32 representatives, the majority of which were elected in five regions; 9 from Melbourne region, 3 from Western Victoria region, 3 from North-Western region, 3 from Northern region, and 3 from Eastern region. A further 11 seats were reserved for formally recognised Traditional Owner Groups. 73 people nominated for the Assembly and approximately 30,000 people were eligible to vote. To vote, eligible voters were first required to enrol online and provide evidence of identity, age and residence. Voting opened on 16 September and closed on 20 October 2019, and voters could cast a ballot online, by post or at one of 43 polling booths across Victoria.

Once elected, the Assembly was not responsible for negotiating a treaty or multiple treaties with the Victorian government on behalf of Aboriginal clans and nations. Instead the Assembly's primary responsibilities were to:
 Establish the Treaty Authority – an independent umpire in the negotiation process
 Establish the Treaty Negotiating Framework – a body who set the ground rules for negotiations and authorised who may negotiate on behalf of certain people/clans
 Establish the Self-Determination Fund – to support Aboriginal communities to be on an even playing field with government when treaties are being negotiated

Results
The 21 elected candidates were announced on 4 November 2019. Seven days later the commission announced the 11 people appointed by formally recognised Traditional Owner groups (termed Registered Aboriginal Parties or Traditional Owner Corporations) to a reserved seat on the Assembly.

The first meeting of the Assembly took place on 10 December 2019 at Parliament House, Melbourne.

Elected members

Reserved seat holders

One seat unfilled, because the Yorta Yorta Nation Aboriginal Corporation were entitled to appoint a member but did not do so. Seat holders may have ancestry from multiple First Nations.

See also
Indigenous treaties in Australia

Notes

References

External links
First Peoples Victoria homepage
Victorian Treaty Advancement Commission homepage 

Elections in Victoria (Australia)
Indigenous Australian politics
2019 elections in Australia
2010s in Victoria (Australia)